Ellis Cashmore (10 February 1949 in Staffordshire, Great Britain) is a British sociologist and cultural critic. He is currently a visiting professor of sociology at Aston University. Before teaching at Aston, he used to teach culture, media and sport at Staffordshire University, starting in 1993. Before 1993, he taught sociology at the University of Tampa, Florida; and, before this, he was a lecturer in sociology at the University of Hong Kong. He is a regular contributor at Fair Observer.

Selected works

Books authored
 Celebrity Culture. Routledge, 2006. .
 The Black Culture Industry. Routledge, 2006 .
 And There Was Television. Routledge, 2002 .
 Dictionary of Race and Ethnic Relations. Routledge, 2002 .

Contributions
 Screen Society. Springer, 2018. .
 Making Sense of Sports. Psychology Press, 2005. .
 Introduction to Race Relations. Psychology Press, 1990 
 No Future: Youth and Society. Pearson Education, 1984

Citations
According to website Briswa, co-founded by Erasmus Programme, Ellis Cashmore "is probably one of the first researchers to investigate racism in football". His works have been cited by other authors and academics, including Dorceta Taylor (The Environment and the People in American Cities, 2009), Yulisa Amadu Maddy (Neo-Imperialism in Children's Literature About Africa 2008), Anthony G. Reddie (Theologising Brexit 2019) or Diego Medrano (Una puta albina colgada del brazo de Francisco Umbral 2010). As a researcher, he also have been cited by media outlets such as Reuters and CNN.

References

External links
CNN: Ellis Cashmore
Reuters: Ellis Cashmore
Aston University: Ellis Cashmore

1949 births
Living people
British sociologists